Moskovskaya pravda ("Moscow Truth", in the transliteration system used by the Library of Congress spelled "Moskovskaia pravda"), is a daily morning newspaper of Russia, and formerly of the Soviet Union.

History 
Moskovskaja Pravda is the first and oldest daily newspaper in Moscow. It was first published in 1918. On March 18, 1920 the newspaper was renamed Communist Labor and became part of the Moscow Committee of the RCP and the Moscow Council. On February 19, 1950 it was renamed again and published under the name Moscow truth.

In 1986 Michail Poltoranin was named as chief editor by the First Secretary of the Moscow City Communist Party Committee Boris Yeltsin.

On its 50th anniversary, the newspaper was awarded the Order of Red Banner of Labor.

On June 30, 2016 the last printed issue was published.

See also 
 Evgeny Dodolev
 Marina Lesko
 Moskovskaya Komsomolka

References

External links
 Moskovskaya Pravdas official website

Newspapers published in the Soviet Union
Mass media in Moscow
Russian-language newspapers published in Russia
Publications established in 1918